Thomas Richard Tillis (born September 22, 1963) is an American politician who served in the Tennessee House of Representatives from the 92nd district as a member of the Republican Party. During his tenure in the state house he served as the Majority Whip.

Tillis, who is the brother of US Senator Thom Tillis, received a GED from the Florida Department of Education. He was elected to the state house in Tennessee in the 2016 election and served until he was defeated in the 2020 Republican primary by Todd Warner. Tillis served as the Majority Whip from 2018 to until his resignation in 2019, after it was discovered that he was running a Twitter account critical of other Republicans in the state house.

Early life
Thomas Richard Tillis was born on September 22, 1963, to Margie and Thomas Raymond Tillis. His brother, Thom Tillis, was later elected as a United States Senator from North Carolina. He received a GED from the Florida Department of Education.

Tennessee House of Representatives

Elections

Tillis ran for the Republican nomination for a seat in the Tennessee House of Representatives from the 92nd district in the 2016 election. He defeated Michael Waggoner by forty votes and defeated Democratic nominee Tamra King in the election. In the 2018 election he defeated Billy Spivey in the Republican primary and Democratic nominee C.S. Coffey in the election. Tillis ran for reelection in the 2020 election, but was defeated by Todd Warner in the Republican primary making him one of four incumbents in the state house to lose renomination.

Tenure

Tillis introduced his first bill in 2017, which attempted to reduce the size of the Tennessee government and it was passed by the state house. During his tenure he served on the Local, State, and Finance, Ways, and Means committees.

During the 2018 United States Senate election Tillis filed a complaint to the United States Office of Special Counsel calling for an investigation into Phil Bredesen's campaign treasurer, Virginia Lodge, for appearing in a campaign ad. Tillis' complaint alleged that Lodge, who was a board member of the Tennessee Valley Authority, was in violation of the Hatch Act by serving as the treasure of Bredesen's campaign while also serving as a federal employee. He stated that being a treasurer was not in violation of the act, but appearing in advertisements was a violation.

In 2018, Tillis was selected by the Republican caucus to serve as the Majority Whip of the Tennessee House of Representatives. In August 2019, House Majority Leader William Lamberth and Representative Andy Holt stated that Tillis had admitted to running an account on Twitter which criticized other Republican members of the Tennessee House of Representatives. On August 30, Representative Jeremy Faison, the chairman of the GOP House caucus, announced in an email that Tillis had stepped down as the Majority Whip. On January 27, 2020, Johnny Garrett was selected to replace Tillis as the Majority Whip.

Electoral history

References

External links
 
 Rick Tillis' campaign website

1963 births
21st-century American politicians
Living people
Republican Party members of the Tennessee House of Representatives